Tank is the capital city of Tank District, Khyber Pakhtunkhwa, Pakistan. The city is located northwest of Dera Ismail Khan, and southeast of Jandola, Tank Subdivision (formerly known as "Frontier Region Tank"). Lakki Marwat and Bannu lies to the northeast while South Waziristan lies to the west.

Climate
The climate in Tank is referred to as a local steppe climate. There is little rainfall throughout the year. This location is classified as BSh by Köppen and Geiger. The average annual temperature in Tank is 24.1 °C | 75.4 °F. The annual rainfall is 539 mm | 21.2 inch.
The temperatures are highest on average in June, at around 34.5 °C | 94.2 °F. The lowest average temperatures in the year occur in January, when it is around 11.9 °C | 53.4 °F.

Language 

Pashto and Saraiki (locally called Hindkou) are the two languages spoken in Tank. The vast majority of people are conversant in the Pashto language as majority of the population consists of Pakhtun or Pashtun tribes. English is also understood by the educated.

Location

It is at 32º13' N. and 70º32' E and is to the northwest of the Indus River and close to the Takht-i-Sulaiman Range.

Localities

The city was previously inside a fort. Here Sir Henry Durand, lieutenant-governor of the Punjab, was killed in 1870 when passing on an elephant under a gateway.

References

Populated places in Tank District
Cities in Khyber Pakhtunkhwa